The men's javelin throw at the 2019 Asian Athletics Championships was held on 22 April.

Results

References

Javelin
Javelin throw at the Asian Athletics Championships